Cychrus lanpingensis is a species of ground beetle in the subfamily of Carabinae. It was described by Deuve in 1997.

References

lanpingensis
Beetles described in 1997